The Hermann Heights Monument is a statue erected in New Ulm, Minnesota. The statue depicts Arminius, an ancient Cheruscan, but locals refer to the statue as Hermann the German. The only National Register of Historic Places property of its kind in Minnesota, the monument remains an impressive remembrance of German ancestry for many Minnesotans and other German Americans. Visitors to the statue can climb the spiral staircase to an observation platform at the base of the statue, which commands a view of the town and the Minnesota River Valley below.

Significance

This statue commemorates the German victory over the Romans at the Battle of the Teutoburg Forest, a symbol of German patriotism.

While Arminius had been known about in Germany since the rediscovery of the writings of Tacitus in the 15th century, German Protestant intellectuals in the first half of the 18th century christened him "Hermann Deutsch" and promoted his status from that of a local tribal leader with family ties to Rome to that of a hero of Alemmani resistance to "Roman" (i.e. Papal) authority; the 19th century added another layer of meaning, namely Pan-German unity and resistance to Revolutionary France and her language. As depicted in this statue, Hermann's eastward gaze and upraised sword signify freedom from Rome. Perhaps not coincidentally, a statue of St. Paul atop the nearby Roman Catholic Cathedral of the Holy Trinity also gazes eastward, with his sword point-down, planted firmly in the ground.

Characteristics
Constructed of sheet copper molded over iron, the  statue stands on a  iron column encircled by a spiral staircase to the dome, which is supported by 10 iron columns and a Kasota stone base.

History

Following the completion of the similarly commemorative Hermannsdenkmal statue in Detmold, Germany, in 1875, the Germanic-American fraternal order of the Sons of Hermann, under the leadership of Julius Berndt, who headed the New Ulm chapter and was then national secretary of the order, paid for the erection of the American monument. Berndt designed the monument setting, for which the cornerstone was laid in 1888. The statue was created by Alfonz Pelzer of the W. H. Mullins Manufacturing Company in Salem, Ohio and shipped to New Ulm. It arrived in 1890 and was dedicated in 1897. Structural and cosmetic restoration projects were carried out in 1998 and again in 2004.

The Hermann Heights Monument was added to the National Register of Historic Places in 1973. It is the third largest copper statue in the United States after the Statue of Liberty and Portlandia in Portland, Oregon.

The 106th United States Congress (2000) designated the Hermann Monument in New Ulm to be a symbol of all citizens of Germanic heritage.

References

External links

 Hermann Monument, New Ulm, Minnesota
 Hermann Monument Society

Monuments and memorials in Minnesota
Outdoor sculptures in Minnesota
1897 sculptures
New Ulm, Minnesota
Buildings and structures in Brown County, Minnesota
German-American culture in Minnesota
German-American history
1897 establishments in Minnesota
Monuments and memorials on the National Register of Historic Places in Minnesota
Copper sculptures in the United States
Iron sculptures in the United States
Stone sculptures in Minnesota
Tourist attractions in Brown County, Minnesota
Beaux-Arts architecture in Minnesota
National Register of Historic Places in Brown County, Minnesota
Cultural depictions of Arminius